Gauslaa is a surname. Notable people with the surname include:

Arne Gauslaa (1913–1942), Norwegian communist, newspaper editor, and resistance member
Einar Gauslaa (1915–1995), Norwegian newspaper editor 

Norwegian-language surnames